In Search of Sunrise 7: Asia is a compilation album by Dutch trance producer and DJ Tiësto and his seventh and final contribution to the In Search of Sunrise compilation series. It was released on 10 June 2008 and was followed by a North American Tour during all of June. In 2008, Tiësto announced his In Search of Sunrise: North American Summer Tour 2008, the tour was presented by Armani Exchange on 23 May and ended on 4 July at the Bonnaroo Music and Arts Festival on Friday 13 June. This tour was in support of the In Search of Sunrise compilation, which was part of a sponsorship partnership, with exclusive apparel and a limited edition 3-CD set. An exclusive best of CD from the DJ’s own imprint Black Hole Recordings, called "10 Years of Black Hole Recordings" was released that year. Armani also sold an exclusive Tiësto branded tour T-shirt, and Tiësto performed at three A|X in-stores during the tour.

To support the release of his new mix compilation, Tiësto kicked off a dedicated North American 2008 In Search of Sunrise Summer Tour, with 36 club shows across the States and Canada on 13 June. He also hosted an exclusive two-month-long residency at Club Privilege in Ibiza. Tiësto was the resident every Monday, starting on 7 July until the closing party on 22 September. Tiësto delivered four hour deejay sets in the style of his In Search Of Sunrise series, everything supported by a newly developed and custom made state of the art production.
A video was released in YouTube which explains the production and making of the compilation and introduces four tracks: "Cary Brothers - Ride (Tiësto Remix)", "Airbase feat. Floria Ambra - Denial", "Banyan Tree  — Feel The Sun Rise", and "Andy Duguid featuring Leah  — Wasted".

The 3xCD Limited Edition of Armani Exchange's In Search of Sunrise 7: Asia compilation was released on 14 June.

Track listing

In Search of Sunrise 7 Asia 2 x LP

A1. Andy Duguid feat. Leah - Wasted
A2. Kamni - Get Lifted

B1. Cary Brothers - Ride ( Tiesto Remix)
B2. Airbase feat. Floria Ambra - Denial

C1. Dokmai - Reason to believe
C2. Zoo Brazil  — Crossroads

D1. Beltek - Kenta
D2. Sied van Riel  — Rush

Charts

Weekly charts

Year-end charts

Certifications

References

External links

Tiësto compilation albums
2008 compilation albums